Mantsi (autonym: ; also called Lô Lô, Flowery Lolo, White Lolo or Black Lolo, is a Lolo-Burmese language. Speakers are mostly located in Hà Giang Province, Vietnam. In China, speakers are classified as a subgroup of the Yi people. In Vietnam they are called Lô Lô and is classified as one of the official 54 ethnic groups in Vietnam.

Classification
Mantsi may be related to the Kathu (Kasu, Gasu) and Mo'ang languages of Wenshan Prefecture, Yunnan, China (Edmondson 2003). Lama (2012) concludes that Mantsi (Mondzi) and Maang constitute the most divergent branch of the Lolo-Burmese languages.

Distribution
Monji or Mondzi is reportedly spoken in some villages of Muyang Township, Funing County, Yunnan, China.

Munji is reportedly spoken by the Flowery Yi (Lolo) of Donggan Town, Malipo County, Yunnan. It is closely related to the Mandzi or Mantsi language of the Flowery Lolo and Black Lolo people of Vietnam and of the White Lolo people of Funing Country. The Red Lolo and Flowery Lolo live across the border in Đồng Văn district, Hà Giang province of Vietnam. Both speak similar languages. The language spoken by the Red Lolo was investigated by Jerold A. Edmondson in the late 1990s.

In Vietnam  
The Lô Lô ethnic group of northern Vietnam consists of 3,134 people in Hà Giang and Cao Bằng, also including some in Mường Khương District of Lào Cai Province. They are also known as Mùn Di, Di, Màn Di, La La, Qua La, Ô Man, and Lu Lộc Màn.

Flowery Lolo
Hà Giang Province
Xín Cái, Mèo Vạc District
Lũng Cù, Đồng Văn District

Red Lolo
Hà Giang Province
Mèo Vạc District
Yên Minh District

Black Lolo
Bảo Lạc District, Cao Bằng Province
Hồng Tri (including Nà Van village)
Đức Hạnh (Bảo Lạc)
Nghàm Lồm, Cô Ba Township

Phonology 
Phonology of Mondzi:

Consonants 

[ŋ] can only appear as a coda. 

Mondzi also has 3 consonant clusters: [lg], [lk], [lkʰ].

Vowels

Monophthongs

Diphthongs

Tones

References

Further reading

 YYFC (1983) [handwritten manuscript], cited in Lama (2012)
 Edmondson, Jerold A. (2003). Three Tibeto-Burman Languages of Vietnam. m.s.
 
 
 

Mondzish languages
Languages of Vietnam
Languages of China